Ich hab' Dich lieb (English: I Love You) is the debut studio album by Schnuffel. It was released in Germany on 9 May 2008 by Columbia Records. After the album was certified gold in Germany for shipments in excess of 100,000 copies, a Gold Edition was released on 10 October 2008, including two bonus versions of "Häschenparty" and three music videos. In the United Kingdom, Ich hab' Dich lieb was released digitally on 30 September 2009, replacing the "Kuschel Song" music video with the bonus track "Für mich bist du das Schönste".

Track listing

International editions
 2008: The Hungarian version by Snufi, Szívemből szól (I Speak with My Heart), excludes the tracks "Alles Gute", "Bleib heute Nacht bei mir" and "Schlaf schön mein Schatz", while adding the bonus track "Für mich bist du das Schönste" as the eleventh track. It also includes the "Kuschel Song" video.
 2008: The Portuguese version by Orelhinhas Schnuffel, Gosto de ti (I Like You), excludes the tracks "Wo bist Du hingegangen", "Alles Gute", "Bleib heute Nacht bei mir", "Schlaf schön mein Schatz" and "Bitte komm doch wieder", while adding the instrumental versions of "Ich hab' Dich lieb", "Kuschel Song", "Hab' dich gern" and "Häschenparty".
 2009: The French version by Lapin Câlin, Le monde magique de Lapin Câlin (The Magic World of Lapin Câlin), excludes the tracks "Alles Gute", "Bleib heute Nacht bei mir" and "Schlaf schön mein Schatz", while adding the bonus track "Für mich bist du das Schönste" as the eleventh track. Also, "Kuschel Song" is the first track, "Häschenparty" is the second and "Ich hab' Dich lieb" is the ninth. It also includes the "Häschenparty" video.

Charts

Weekly charts

Year-end charts

Certifications

References

2008 debut albums
Columbia Records albums
German-language albums
Schnuffel albums